Park Han-woong (born January 15, 1995) is a South Korean male weightlifter, competing in the 94 kg category and representing South Korea at international competitions. He participated in the men's 94 kg event  at the 2015 World Weightlifting Championships, and at the 2016 Summer Olympics, finishing in tenth position.

Major results

References

1995 births
Living people
South Korean male weightlifters
Place of birth missing (living people)
Weightlifters at the 2016 Summer Olympics
Olympic weightlifters of South Korea
21st-century South Korean people